The Martin Bridge Formation is a geologic formation in Idaho. It preserves fossils dating back to the Triassic period.

See also

 List of fossiliferous stratigraphic units in Idaho
 Paleontology in Idaho

References
 

Triassic Idaho
Triassic geology of Oregon